Scirpoides holoschoenus is a species of perennial sedge in the family Cyperaceae, commonly called the roundhead bulrush. It has a self-supporting growth form and simple, broad leaves. They are associated with freshwater habitat. Individuals can grow to 0.75 m.

Sources

References 

Cyperaceae
Flora of Malta